Kyzyl-Yul (Qıźıl Yul) is a rural locality (a village) in Baymurzinsky Selsoviet, Mishkinsky District, Bashkortostan, Russia. The population was 25 as of 2010. There is 1 street.

Geography 
Kyzyl-Yul is located 52 km northwest of Mishkino (the district's administrative centre) by road. Lenin-Bulyak is the nearest rural locality.

References 

Rural localities in Mishkinsky District